Point Retreat Light is a lighthouse located on the Mansfield Peninsula at the northern tip of Admiralty Island in southeastern Alaska, United States. It provides aid in navigation through the Lynn Canal.

Naming
Point Retreat was named by Joseph Whidbey on July 19, 1794, because of his need to retreat from local Tlingit.

History
Point Retreat was set aside as a  lighthouse reserve in 1901 by executive order of President William McKinley, but the point had to wait for its lighthouse due to inadequate funding. Point Retreat was first lit in 1904 and displayed a fixed white light. The first Point Retreat Lighthouse was a six-foot-tall hexagonal wooden tower, topped by a hexagonal lantern room. In 1917, Point Retreat was stripped of its personnel and downgraded to a minor light until 1924, when a new combination lighthouse and fog signal was built. The lantern was removed in the 1950s and a solar-powered 300 mm lens was installed on a post attached to the tower. In 1973 the light was again unmanned and downgraded to a minor light again.

In 2003 the light was added to the National Register of Historic Places.

Gallery

See also

 List of lighthouses in the United States
National Register of Historic Places listings in Juneau, Alaska

References

External links

 
 Lighthouse Friends — Point Retreat Lighthouse
 

1904 establishments in Alaska
Historic districts on the National Register of Historic Places in Alaska
Lighthouses completed in 1904
Lighthouses completed in 1924
Lighthouses in Unorganized Borough, Alaska
Lighthouses on the National Register of Historic Places in Alaska
Buildings and structures on the National Register of Historic Places in Hoonah–Angoon Census Area, Alaska